Alam Megah LRT station is a Light Rapid Transit station at Alam Megah in Shah Alam, Selangor.

It is operated under the Kelana Jaya LRT system network as found in the station signage. Like most other LRT stations operating in Klang Valley, this station is elevated.

Bus Services
Kumpool Vanpool ride-sharing service to the station also available here.

Feeder buses

Other buses

Around the station
SJK (C) Tun Tan Siew Sin (敦陈修信华小)
SK HICOM

References

External links 
Alam Megah LRT station

Kelana Jaya Line
Railway stations opened in 2016
Shah Alam